Jules Limbeck (born in Hungary, died in 1955) was a Franco-Hungarian professional football forward and manager.

Career
He played in various European championships in frontline positions in mid-1920, appeared in the Hungarian Újpest FC, Ferencvárosi TC, in Belgium, and FK Austria Wien.

In 1930 he coached the Turkish Galatasaray S.K. and brought them to the championship. In France, he worked with the Olympique Lyonnais, Racing, Amiens SC (1934–1935).

In 1936 he arrived in the Soviet Union, and spent some time working with the city teams Zaporizhia and Dnipropetrovsk including Stal Dnipropetrovsk, then the order of the All-Union Committee for Physical Culture and Sports of the USSR it was sent to Tbilisi. Limbeck stayed there until March 1937 and worked as chief coach of Dinamo Tbilisi, which reached the finals of the USSR, then he organized a children's football school.

In 1937 he was head coach of Lokomotiv Moscow.

Honours

Manager
Galatasaray S.K.
Istanbul Football League: 1930–31

FC Dinamo Tbilisi
Soviet Cup finalist: 1936

References

External links

1955 deaths
People from Aiud
People from the Kingdom of Hungary
Romanian sportspeople of Hungarian descent
Hungarian emigrants to France
Hungarian footballers
French footballers
Hungarian football managers
French football managers
French expatriate football managers
Újpest FC players
Ferencvárosi TC footballers
FK Austria Wien players
Amiens SC players
Galatasaray S.K. (football) managers
Olympique Lyonnais managers
Expatriate football managers in the Soviet Union
Expatriate football managers in Turkey
FC Dnipro managers
FC Dinamo Tbilisi managers
FC Lokomotiv Moscow managers
Amiens SC managers
Association football forwards
1904 births